The Boatmen of Thessaloniki or the Assassins of Salonica, was a Bulgarian anarchist group,  active in the Ottoman Empire in the years between 1898 and 1903. The members of the Group were predominantly from Veles and most of them − young graduates from the Bulgarian Men's High School of Thessaloniki. The group was radicalized by the Bulgarian anarchist Slavi Merdzhanov, whose initial target was the capital Constantinople, and subsequently  Adrianople, but  after his execution by the Ottomans in 1901, the group's attention shifted to Thessaloniki. From 28 April until 1 May 1903 the group launched a campaign of terror bombing in Thessaloniki. Their aim was to attract the attention of the Great Powers to Ottoman oppression in Macedonia and Thrace. The group's roots can be traced to 1898 in Geneva, and nearly all its founders were natives from Bulgaria. It was associated with the Internal Macedonian-Adrianople Revolutionary Organization, but had also close ties with the Supreme Macedonian-Adrianople Committee. The result of the bombings was disastrous for the Bulgarian community in Thessaloniki. According to the post-WWII Macedonian historiography, the group consisted of ethnic Macedonians.

Origins and etymology 

The Group draws its roots from the Bulgarian anarchist movement which grew in the 1890s, and the territory of Principality of Bulgaria became a staging-point for anarchist activities against the Ottomans, particularly in support of Macedonian and Thracian liberation movements. The Boatmen of Thessaloniki  were a descendant of a group founded in 1895 in Plovdiv and called "Macedonian Secret Revolutionary Committee", which was developed in 1898 in Geneva in  a secret, anarchistic, brotherhood called "Geneva group". Its activists were the students Michail Gerdjikov, Petar Mandjukov and Slavi Merdjanov. They were influenced from the anarcho-nationalism, which emerged in Europe, following the French Revolution, going back at least to Mikhail Bakunin and his involvement with the Pan-Slavic movement. The anarchists in the so-called "Geneva group" of students played key roles in the anti-Ottoman struggles. Nearly all the members who founded the Committee in Geneva were natives from Bulgaria and not from Macedonia. Despite of non-Macedonian descent, they espoused Macedonian identity, emancipated from the pan-Bulgarian national project. Their motto was: No gods, no masters. 

In 1899 Merdjanov moved to the Bulgarian school in Salonika, where he worked as teacher and sparked some of the graduates with this ideas. In 1900 Petar Mandzhukov also resided in Thessaloniki, where had a contact with the Gemidzii and they were influenced by his anarchist ideas, especially those relating to methods of terrorist struggle. The first meetings of the group took part in 1899 with the purpose of forming a revolutionary terrorist group with aim of changing international public opinion in the matter of the freedom of Macedonia and Adrianople Thrace through urging the social conscience of the oppressed. The group is found in published works with several names: "The boatmen of Thessaloniki", the "Crew", or the "Gemitzides", form of the Ottoman word for "boatman". At their start, they had a different name, the "Troublemakers", gürültücü. The name "boatmen" was due to "leaving behind the everyday life and the limits of law and sail with a boat in the free and wild seas of lawlessness." Their new slogan became "we will spend ourselves", i.e. we will die in the name of the freedom of the people.

Attack plans and actions in Istanbul 

At first the anarchists started to make plans for a bomb attack in Istanbul. In the summer of 1899, under the leadership of Slavi Merdjanov the group planned the assassination of the Sultan. Merdzjanov, Petar Sokolov and their friend, the anarchist Petar Mandjukov,  approached Boris Sarafov, the leader of Supreme Macedonian-Adrianople Committee, and asked him for funds to finance large-scale terrorist activities in the main towns of Ottoman Empire. He promised to provide money, and the three left for Istanbul, where after much discussion, they decided to assassinate the Sultan. In December of the same year Merdjanov was connected by the secretary of Bulgarian Exarchate Dimitar Lyapov with local Armenian revolutionaries. Here they established that even with the help of the Armenians it was impossible to do it. Quite early on, they decided that the effect of the explosion would be greater if there were parallel actions in other towns, and they consulted with Jordan Popjordanov, a member of a small terrorist group in Salonika, who agreed to blow up the Salonika branch of the Ottoman Bank. He enlisted the aid of a number of close friends. Salonika terrorists were very young men, mostly from Veles, pupils in the Bulgarian High School. The Salonika terrorist group called itself "the Gemidzhi". They planned to begin by blowing up the central offices of the Ottoman Bank in Salonika and Istanbul. During 1900 Merdjanov arrived again in Istanbul to discuss the plan with the Armenians, and afterward the terrorists started to work, digging tunnels in both places. On 18 September 1900 the Ottoman police apprehended a member of a group, who was carrying the explosives and later the whole group was arrested, including  Merdjanov, Sokolov and Pavel Shatev. The core was hastily disbanded for security and only Pingov stayed in Thessaloniki to prepare future activity. In 1901 the prisoners were deported το Bulgaria, after pressure from the Bulgarian government.

Attack plans and actions in Adrianople 

Merdzjanov and Sokolov went to Sofia and began to think up new ideas, one of which was to hold up the Orient Express on Ottoman territory near Adrianople, and to gain possession of the mail in order to finance future actions. In pursuit of this plan, they went to the Adrianople area in July 1901, with a cheta consisting of ten men, equipped with the help of Pavel Genadiev, the Supreme Macedonian Committee's representative in Plovdiv. The cheta managed to place a large quantity of dynamite on the railway line, but something went wrong, and the train passed undamaged. They learned then that the Persian Shah would pass through Adrianople by train, preparing to take him on the station at Lule Burgas, but failed. From there they headed to Adrianople with the intention of capturing the governor, who was the son-in-law of the Sultan, but failed again. After this failure, they kidnapped the son of a rich local Turkish landowner, but they were soon discovered and surrounded by large Turkish forces. In a battle which lasted several hours, most of the chetnitsi were killed or seriously wounded. Sokolov was among the dead, and Merdzjanov was captured alive, together with a Bulgarian from Lozengrad, and two Armenians. The captives were taken to Adrianople, where, in November 1901, all four were publicly hanged. The Gemidzhii were ready for action again in 1902, but the seizure in Dedeagach of dynamite, arranged by Supreme Macedonian Committee's leader Boris Sarafov, forced the group to abandon planned attacks of Austrian post office in Adrianople, and to restrict its activity. Afterwards the members of the group went to Thessaloniki and continued to plan their new bombings.

Bombings in Thessaloniki 

On the 28 April 1903, a member of the group, Pavel Shatev, used dynamite to blow up the French ship "Guadalquivir" which was leaving the Thessaloniki harbour. The bomber left the ship together with the other passengers, but was caught later by the Turkish police at the Skopje train station. The same night, other group bombers: Dimitar Mechev, Iliya Trachkov, and Milan Arsov, struck the railway between Thessaloniki and Istanbul, causing damage to the locomotive and some of the cars of a passing train without wounding any passengers.

The next day, the signal to begin the large raid in Thessaloniki was given by Kostadin Kirkov who used explosives to shut off the electricity and water supply systems of the city. Jordan Popjordanov (Orceto) blew up the building of an Ottoman Bank office, under which the "gemidzhii" had previously dug a tunnel. Milan Arsov threw bombs in the "Alhambra" Café. The same night, Kostadin Kirkov, Iliya Bogdanov and Vladimir Pingov detonated bombs in different parts of the city. Dimitar Mechev and Iliya Truchkov failed to blast the reservoir of a gas-producing plant. They were later killed in their quarters during a shoot-out with army and gendarmerie forces, against which Mechev and Trachkov used more than 60 bombs.

Jordan Popjordanov was killed on April 30. In May, Kostadin Kirkov was killed while trying to blow up a postal office. Right before being caught, Cvetko Traikov, whose mission was to kill the local governor, killed himself by setting off a bomb and then sitting on it.

Related attacks in Burgas and Kuleliburgaz
Continuation of the Thessaloniki bombings were the bombing in the same year of the passenger train near the railway station Kuleliburgaz led by Mihail Gerdzhikov and the bombing campaign of the passenger ship "Vaskapu" in the Burgas Bay led by Anton Prudkin, both organized by anarchists close to the Internal Macedonian-Adrianople Revolutionary Organization (IMARO). The daily express from Budapest to Istanbul was blown up near Kuleliburgaz on August 28. The explosion was intended to destroy a bridge and cut off the communication between Adrianople and Thessaloniki. Seven persons were killed and fifteen were injured. Two cars were smashed. The second terrorist act on the board of the Austro-Hungarian river- and sea- steamer Vaskapu occurred on 2 Sept. The detonating of the ship, dates back to the time when the passenger traffic with ships between Danube river and the Black Sea ports was busy all the way to Istanbul. It killed the captain, two officers, six of the crew, and 15 passengers, and set fire to the vessel. The assailants - Ivan Stoyanov and Stefan Dimitrov, both close relatives of Zahari Stoyanov, also died by the explosion. It was planned to attack the port of Istanbul, with four ships being exploded there on 9 September: besides "Vaskapu",  these were the Austro-Hungarian "Apollo", the German "Tenedos" and the French "Felix Fressinet". Due to the premature explosion of "Vaskapu", the plan failed.

Aftermath 
In the wake of the attacks, martial law was declared in the city. As a response the Turkish Army and "bashibozouks" massacred many innocent Bulgarian citizens in Thessaloniki to purge the province of the Bulgarian "threat", and later in Bitola. Pavel Shatev, Marko Boshnakov, Georgi Bogdanov and Milan Arsov were arrested and sentenced by a court martial to a penal colony in Fezzan. Also members of the Central Committee of IMORO, including Ivan Garvanov, D. Mirchev, and J. Kondov were incarcerated.

In Libya, Boshnakov died from malaria on February 14, 1908 and Arsov from exhaustion on June 8, the same year. After July 30, 1908, because of the victory of the movement of the Young Turks, Ottoman amnesty was given to the two remaining "Boatmen". They cut the heads of their dead comrades and arrived in Thessaloniki on October 18, where they gave the heads to the parents of the deceased.

Members 

The members of the boatmen were as follows:
Yordan Popyordanov, called Ortzeto was born 1881 in Veles, considered the leader of the Group from a bourgeois family and mixed with radical-revolutionary organizations after he entered the Salonika  Bulgarian School in 1894. He is thought to be the mastermind of the Boatmen. He was killed during the bombings and he is the only one of the boatmen from whom no picture is saved.
Kostadin Kirkov, born 1882 in Veles, was bonded with Ortzeto from early age. They entered the Bulgarian School at the same age. He was known for his great memory and his sarcastic humour.
Milan Arsov, born 1886 in Oraovetz near Veles, was the youngest of the team and still at the 4th grade of school when the attacks were made. He died in exile.
Dimitar Mechev, born 1870 in Veles tried to kill a man from the local authority with an axe in 1898. When he failed, he left for the mountains to join with armed guerrilla groups. He died during the events.
Georgi Bogdanov, born 1882 in Veles,  originate from a wealthy family. In 1901 his father sent him in Thessaloniki to work in a real estate office. As a part of the Gemidzii he threw a bomb on the restaurant "Noja". Bogdanov was arrested and sent into exile in Libiya. Following the Young Turk Revolution he was pardoned. Bogdanov died on June 12, 1939 in Sofia.
Iliya Trachkov, born 1885 Veles worked in Thessaloniki as a shoemaker. He died during the bombings.
Vladimir Pingov, born 1885 in Veles,  was a "daredevil" and always took the most dangerous missions. He was the first of the group who died.
Marko Boshnakov born 1878 from Ohrid, it is said that he was an officer in the Bulgarian army and he was the one that made the plans for the tunnel under the Bank. He was the only one who did not take part in the bombings. He was caught 14 days after the bombings, exiled in 1908 and died in Fezan, Libya, in the same year.
Tsvetko Traykov, born in 1878 was from Resen and lived several years in Salonika. He was an active member of the Bulgarian community. He was the last of the team killed during the events.
Pavel Shatev, born in Kratovo in 1882. His father was a trader. He got in the Bulgarian School in 1896. From 1910 until 1913 he returned to Salonika and worked as a teacher in the Bulgarian Mercantile College. He died in home custody in Bitola in 1951.

Modern references 

Despite the Bulgarian identification of its members, and the fact, the only survivor from the group — Pavel Shatev, was jailed in SR Macedonia for his pro-Bulgarian and anti-Yugoslav sympathies, all members of the group are considered today part of the national pantheon  of North Macedonia. Historians from Bulgaria emphasize the undoubted Bulgarian ethnic identification of the anarchists, but tend to downplay the moves for political autonomy, that were a part of the group's ideology.

Reproduction in art and literature
"Thessalonica bombings and the exiles in Fezzan", based on the memoires of Pavel Shatev, was published in 1927 in Sofia by the Macedonian Scientific Institute. Following the story of the Group it was fictionalized in the 1930 novel "Robi" (Slaves) by the Bulgarian writer Anton Strashimirov, who was a former member of the IMARO. "In Macedonia under slavery. The Thessalonica conspiracy (1903)", a recollections of Pavel Shatev, was published in 1934 in Sofia by the IMRO-revolutionary Peter Glushkov. In 1961 a Yugoslav production movie called The Salonika Terrorists was filmed, focusing on the struggle for independent Macedonia. In 1983, the writer Georgi Danailov (1936-2017) created the play "The Thessalonica conspirators", that is popular in the theaters in Bulgaria till today. Kosta Tsarnushanov (1903-1996), an activist of the MYSRO, wrote a documentary novel "Thessaloniki Assassins" published in Sofia in 1997. The Municipality of Veles constructed a monument by a recently built iron bridge. As part of the project Skopje 2014, a monument was also erected in the centre of Skopje, North Macedonia, in honour of the Гемиџии.

See also 

Macedonian Question
List of anarchist communities
Boatmen of Thessaloniki (film)
Occupation of the Ottoman Bank (1896)

Notes

Sources 
 Благов, Крум "50-те най-големи атентата в българската история", Издателство Репортер, 2000 г. , № 2. Солунските атентати. (Bulgarian)
 Солунските атентатори - Документи, снимки, линкове - (Bulgarian and English)
 Павел Шатев, В Македония под робство.  Изд. на Отеч. фронт, София, 1983 г. (Bulgarian)
 Солунският атентат и заточениците във Фезан. По спомени на Павел Шатев. (Bulgarian)
 Христо Силянов, "Освободителните борби на Македония", Том I, стр.243-262 (Bulgarian)
  Ползите и вредите от солунските атентати. Цочо В. Билярски. (Bulgarian)
  Предвестници на бурята, Петър Манджуков. Федерацията на анархистите в България, София, 2013. (Bulgarian)
James Sotros The Greek Speaking Anarchist and Revolutionary Movement (1830–1940) Writings for a History, No God-No Masters, December 2004.

External links 

 Ottoman Bank archives and research centre - the Salonica Branch

Anarchist organizations in Greece
Anarchist organizations in Bulgaria
Ottoman Thessalonica
Defunct anarchist militant groups
1903 in the Ottoman Empire
Salonica vilayet
Internal Macedonian Revolutionary Organization
Left-wing militant groups in Greece
Macedonian Question